Etherley is a civil parish in County Durham, England. It had a population of 2,060 at the 2011 Census.

References

Civil parishes in County Durham